Dogosé, or Doghose, is a Gur language of Burkina Faso.

There are multiple spellings of this name, due to the difficulties of spelling the second consonant, . Dogosé is currently preferred, but traditional Doghose is found in much of the literature. Rarer spellings are (Doro) Doghosié, Dokhosié, Dorhossié, Dorhosye, Dorosie, Dorossé and, with a different suffix, Dokhobe, Dorobé.

Dialect, which are close, are Klamaasise, Mesise, Lutise, Gbeyãse, Sukurase, Gbogorose.

References

Gur languages
Languages of Burkina Faso